Advance-deposit wagering (ADW) is a form of gambling on the outcome of horse races in which bettors must fund their account before being allowed to place bets. ADW is often conducted online or by phone. In contrast to ADW, credit shops allow wagers without advance funding; accounts are settled at month-end. Racetrack owners, horse trainers and state governments sometimes receive a share of ADW revenues.

It typically involves betting on horse or greyhound racing. Wagering may take place through parimutuel pools.

Legality

Illinois was the first state to offer ADW and has allowed its adult residents to participate in ADW since 1999 under the Illinois Horse Racing Act of 1975; Illinois receives a cut of ADW revenues.
Shortly thereafter, Connecticut, Maryland, New York, Oklahoma, and Pennsylvania allowed the practice as well. By 2011, 28 states expressly allowed advance-deposit wagering, with 13 remaining in a bit of a "grey area" as the practice isn't explicitly prohibited by state law.
Since the IGA was created in 2001, there have been a couple of updates to it. Amendments were made in 2017 and then again in 2019. These amendments mainly related to advertising and player protection. While these changes tightened up the regulatory environment, it also resulted in over 150 operators leaving Australia.

Impact
Chapter 58 of the New York State Laws of 2012 added a new Section 911 to the New York State
Racing, Pari-Mutuel Wagering and Breeding Law (Racing Law). Section 911 requires the New
York State Racing and Wagering Board (Board) to assess the impact of advanced deposit
wagering (ADW) in New York State including, but not limited to:
 The impact of out-of-state account wagering providers (OSAWP) accepting wagers from New York State residents;
 The annual dollar amount wagered by New York State residents through OSAWPs;
 The number of OSAWP accounts held by New York State residents;
 Information concerning New York State residents who utilize OSAWPs including residency.

Section 911 of the Racing Law required that the study, along with any recommendations, be submitted to the Governor and the Legislature by September 15, 2012.

The results of the survey revealed that New York residents bet $165,567,707 in 2010 and $142,246,859 YTD 9/30/11 through the responding OSAWPs. This includes wagering on the New York racing product and on out-of-state racetracks. Table 1 provides detail of the handle by New York racetracks and out-of-state racetracks. The Board estimates this handle will exceed $200,000,000 in 2012.

The survey also showed that OSAWPs listed 18,769 accounts in 2010 and 21,310 accounts in YTD 9/30 2011 as New York resident accounts. All 62 New York State counties are represented. Table 2 lists the number of accounts by the county in which the zip code originated. Table 2-A lists the number of accounts by statutorily defined Off-Track Betting Regions. NJ Account Wagering, Sol Mutuel, Global Wagering Solutions and Elite Turf Club reported having no New York accounts.

References

Gambling terminology
Horse racing in the United States
Online gambling